Merewalesi Roden (born September 9, 1967) is a Fijian Paralympic athlete. She competed at the 2016 Summer Paralympics for Fiji in table tennis. She lost her first match to South Korea's Jung Young-a in three straight sets. She also lost her last match to Sweden's Ingela Lundbäck. She won a silver medal at the 2015 Oceania Para Championships and a gold medal at the 2015 Pacific Games in the women's seated category.

References 

1967 births
Living people
Paralympic table tennis players of Fiji
Table tennis players at the 2016 Summer Paralympics
Fijian table tennis players